Hanoch may refer to:
 Hanoch, the son of Reuben and head of the Hanochite branch of the tribe of Reuben (Numbers 26:5)
 Hanoch Albeck (1890–1972), Israeli professor
 Hanoch Bartov (1926–2016), Israeli author
 Hanoch Gutfreund, Israeli Andre Aisenstadt Chair in theoretical physics, and former President, of  the Hebrew University of Jerusalem
 Hanoch Hecht, American rabbi
 Hanoch Levin (1943–1999), Israeli dramatist
 Hanoch Piven (born 1963), Israeli illustrator
 Hanoch Teller (born 1956),  Austrian-American author
 Moses ben Hanoch (died 965), medieval Babylonian-born Spanish rabbi
 Shalom Hanoch (born 1946), Israeli musician
 Hanoch bar Ya'akov Kafka, Hebrew name of Franz Kafka's father

See also 
 Enoch (disambiguation)
 Henoch (disambiguation)
 Hanok, a traditional Korean house